The Bindhyabasini Temple (Nepali: बिन्ध्यबासिनी मन्दिर) is the oldest temple in the city of Pokhara, Nepal and is located in Ward No. 2, Miruwa. It regularly attracts a large number of locals, Nepalis from across the country and foreigners alike. The main temple is devoted to goddess Bindhyabasini, a Bhagawati who is the incarnation of Kali. There are smaller temples of goddess Saraswati, Shiva, Hanuman, Ganesha in the premises. The temple is situated atop a small hill and can be accessed via stone staircases on the East and North East.

The views of the Himalayas from the North of the temple are breathtaking while from the South one can see the expanse of Pokhara city.

History 
The temple was established circa 1760s. King Girvan Yuddha Bikram Shah, the then king of Nepal appointed Kahindra Padhya Poudel in June 1815 AD as temple priest replacing Harivamsha Padhya. Its stated the priest could use the Guthi Lands endowed for the temple to perform regular and ceremonial puja.

Legend on the establishment of the temple 
The king of Kaski, Sidddhi Narayan Shah or the king of Parbat Khadgaman Malla saw a dream about establishing a temple for goddess Bindhyabasini. He had his men go to Bindhyachal Parbat (currently in Uttar Pradesh, India) to bring back a statue of the goddess. The men when returning set camp for a night in the current location of the temple. When they woke up the next morning to resume their journey, they found they couldn't lift the statue from the ground. When informed of the situation, the king directed his people to establish the temple and hence the beginning of Bindhyabasini Temple.

Common belief about goddess Bindhyabasini 
Goddess Bindhyabasini is commonly believed by the residents of Miruwa that she is the replacement for the eighth child (Lord Krishna) of Devaki and Vasudeva. When Kansa tries to kill the child, who's been exchanged, she, who's herself a Devi disappears and is in fact goddess Bindhyabasini.

Architecture 
There's no information about the style of the original temple (and it is assumed to have been rebuilt at some point) but the current temple is in Shikhara style. Shikhara style of temple architecture is considered older than the much prevalent Pagoda architecture.

Two golden metal lions stand erect beside the temple gate and metal gong-bells eerie in the background frequently. The Bindhyabasini temple in a glance is a simple yet striking monument. The local “Dharmik Chhetra Bikas Samiti” regulates the temple.

Buildings in the premises 

 Saraswati Mandir
 Hanuman Mandir
 Shiva Mandir
 Bindhyabasini Sanskrit Vidyalaya
 Book store
 Vishnu Mandir
 Ganesha Mandir
 Jogi Paati

Temple Area Management 
The temple is currently managed by Bindhyabasini Dharmik Chettra Bikash Samiti  which has carried out a number of improvements and upgraded the area. Examples include establishment of Gurukul bhawan, upgrades to various smaller temples in the area, upgrade of Bindhyabasini park below the temple area etc.

History 
The temple was built in 1842 B.S. in 47 ropanis of land. The legend of Bindhyabasini temple begins when the king of Kaski , Siddhi Narayan Malla or the king of Parbat, Khadgaman Malla dreamt about establishing a temple for the goddess. So, he ordered some of his men to bring back a statue of the goddess from present Uttar Pradesh of India.

During their journey, the men set up camps at the current temple location. However, the next morning they could not move on their journey because the deity could not be lifted from the camps. So, eventually, the temple was established in Mohariya Tole of Pokhara.

Since then this place has been a hub for worshippers. The meaning of ‘Bindhya” means incarnation of goddess and “Basini” means the dweller of a place.

Accessibility 
A lift with a capacity of 12 people was installed in the temple premises, and inaugurated by the President of Nepal on March 7, 2019. The lift is primarily used by disabled pilgrims and seniors.

A Senior Citizens Friendship Center was established in January 2016. The facility allows for a meeting point for senior citizens, provides food every day to those who attend and arranges for talks on a variety of subjects.

Noted Fact 
Most of Pokhara city was destroyed in the fire of 1949 and the fire was allegedly started in Bindhyabasini temple while performing an offering which later spread out of control.

Temple in the News 

 The royal couple of former King Gyanendar and Queen Komal did puja at the temple March 27, 2004.
 Indian Army Chief comes visiting, locals know he speaks fluent Nepali, February 13, 2018.
 Navadurga Festival organized by Bindhyabasini Dharmik Chhettra Bikash Samiti September 21, 2017.

See also
List of Hindu temples in Nepal

References

Temples in Pokhara